Persecution of Christians by Christians occurs when one Christian denomination persecutes another Christian denomination, either nonviolently via religious censorship and coercion or violently via religious wars, sieges, massacres, rebellions, crusades, or acts of terrorism.

Nonviolent persecution

Excommunication 
The first ecumenical council of orthodox catholic Christianity decided upon the doctrine of the trinity, promulgated the Nicean Creed to enforce this doctrinal requirement, and excommunicated all sects who would not recite it.  Although defined primarily against Arianism and anomean christology, those excommunicated included Ebionites, Nazarenes, and other Jewish-Christians.

Censorship 

Bulls, etc., from Rome Act 1571, by Anglicans against Catholics
Conventicle Act 1664 and Conventicles Act 1670, by Anglicans against non-Anglicans
Corporation Act 1661, by Anglicans against Presbyterians
Five Mile Act 1665, by Anglicans against non-Anglicans
Heresy Act 1382, by Catholics against Christians deemed heretics
Italian Racial Laws, by Catholics against Evangelicals and Pentecostals
Jesuits, etc. Act 1584, by Anglicans against Catholics
Popery Act 1698, by Anglicans against Catholics
Popish Recusants Act 1592 and Popish Recusants Act 1605, by Anglicans against Catholics
Putting away of Books and Images Act 1549, by Anglicans against non-Anglicans
Revival of the Heresy Acts, by Catholics against Protestants
See of Rome Act 1536, by Anglicans against Catholics
Statute in Restraint of Appeals, by Anglicans against Catholics
Suppression of Religious Houses Act 1535 and Suppression of Religious Houses Act 1539, by Anglicans against Catholics

Coercion

Acts of Supremacy, by Catholics against Catholics who submitted to the Pope
Act of Uniformity, by Anglicans against non-Anglican 
Religion Act 1580 and Religion Act 1592, by Anglicans against Catholics
Union of Brest and Union of Uzhhorod, by Catholics against Orthodox Christians

Violent persecution

Crusades

 Fourth Crusade, by Catholics against the Orthodox Christians of the Byzantine Empire

Albigensian Crusade, by Catholics against Cathars
Northern Crusades, by Catholics against Orthodox Christians
 Drenther Crusade, against the Dutch Drenther peasants from 1228 to 1232;
 Bosnian Crusade fighting the Hungarians from 1227;
 Stedinger Crusade against the Stedinger peasants from 1232 to 1234;
 Crusades against English rebels in 1216, 1217 and 1265;
 Crusades against Greek Orthodox Byzantines fighting to reclaim territory lost to the Fourth Crusade in 1231, 1239 and the 14thcentury until the Ottomans provided a greater threat.
 Crusades against the Hohenstaufens of Germany and Sicily from 1239 to 1269 preventing encirclement by their German, Italian and Sicilian territories, reassert papal feudal claims over Sicily and defend the March of Ancona and the duchy of Spoleto. Church taxation funded John of Brienne campaigns of 1228 to 1230 but it was in 1239 that Gregory IX first called a formal crusade when Frederick threatened Rome having defeated the Lombard League. Following the emperor’s death crusading continued against his sons, the legitimate Conrad IV of Germany and the illegitimate Manfred, King of Sicily. Pope Clement IV recruited Charles I of Anjou, the younger brother of Louis IX of France, who in February 1266 defeated and killed Manfred at the Benevento, in August 1268 defeated Conradin, Conrad IV’s son, at Tagliacozzo and ended the Staufen dynasty male line in October with Conradin’s execution in October.
 Crusade against Ezzelino III da Romano and his brother Alberic in 1255.
 Crusade against Sardinia in 1263
 The Sicilian Vespers, wars for Angevin control of Sicily from 1282 to 1302. In 1282 the Sicilians rebelled against Charles I of Anjou and Frederick’s son in law, Peter III of Aragon, annexed the island. A 1283 crusade invading Aragon and a 1285 crusade invading the island by Philip III of France failed. Crusading against Aragonese rulers continued when Frederick II of Sicily refused to return the island to the Angevins. This ended in 1302 with the treaty of Caltabellota.
 Crusades maintaining papal interests during the Avignon Papacy from 1309 to 1377.
 Crusades during the Western Schism between 1378 and 1417.
 Crusades against Louis IV, Holy Roman Emperor reasserting imperial claims from 1310 to1313.
 Pope Boniface VIII's crusades against the Colonna family in 1297.
 Crusade against the heresies of Fra Dolcino in Piedmont in 1306. 
 Crusades against Venice over Ferrara in 1309/1310
 Crusades organised by cardinal-legates such as Bertrand du Pouget and Gil Albornoz against Milan and Ferrara in 1321; against Milan, Mantua, and rebels in Ancona in 1324; against Cesena and Faenza in 1354, against Milan again in 1360, 1363, and 1368, against mercenary companies such as that of Konrad von Landau In 1357, 1361 and 1369/1370.
 Crusades during the Great Schism between 1378 and 1417, crusades were launched by the Roman Pope Urban VI called crusades against his Avignon rival Pope Clement VII in 1378. Clement VII gave crusade privileges to competitors in the Neapolitan succession as did Antipope John XXIII in 1411 and 1414.
 In 1383, Henry le Despenser’s English campaign against Flanders was given the status of crusade by Pope Urban VI  as was John of Gaunt’s attempt on the throne of Castile in 1386.

Massacres
Catholic clergy involvement with the Ustaše, by Catholics against Eastern Orthodox Christians
Inquisition, by Catholics against Catholics who were deemed to be crypto-jews heretics or witches
Massacre of Mérindol, by Catholics against Waldensians
Massacre of Vassy, by Catholics against Huguenots
Salem witch trials, by Puritans against Puritans who were deemed to be witches
St. Bartholomew's Day massacre, by Catholics against Huguenots
Witch trials in the early modern period, by various Christians against various Christians who were deemed to be witches

Rebellions
1562 Riots of Toulouse, by Huguenots against Catholics
Bigod's rebellion, by Catholics against Protestants
Day of the Barricades, by Catholics against Protestants
Huguenot rebellions, by Huguenots against Catholics
Irish Rebellion of 1641, by Catholics against Protestants
Knight's Revolt, by Protestants against Catholics
Pilgrimage of Grace, by Catholics against Protestants
Spanish Fury, by Protestants against Catholics

Sieges
Siege of Caudebec, by Protestants against Catholics
Siege of Drogheda, by Protestants against Catholics

Terrorism

Gunpowder Plot, by Catholics against Protestants

Wars

Battle of Carbisdale, by Anglicans against Covenanters
Battle of Inverkeithing, by Anglicans against Covenanters
Battle of Rathmines, by Anglicans against Catholics
Eighty Years' War, by Catholics against Protestants
European wars of religion, by Catholics against Protestants and Protestants against Protestants during the 16th, 17th and early 18th centuries
First Battle of Newbury, by Protestants against Catholics
First War of Kappel and Second War of Kappel, by Protestants against Catholics 
Irish Confederate Wars, by Catholics against Protestants
German Peasants' War, by Anabaptists against Catholics
Schmalkaldic War and Second Schmalkaldic War, by Catholics against Lutherans
Sonderbund War, by Protestants against Catholics
Thirty Years' War, by Protestants against Catholics
Toggenburg War, by Protestants against Catholics
War of the Eight Saints, by Catholics against Catholics who were associated with the Avignon Papacy
War of the Three Henrys, by Catholics against Protestants
Wars of the Three Kingdoms, by Protestants against Catholics

See also
Anti-Catholicism
Anti-Mormonism
Anti-Protestantism
Christian terrorism
Christianity and violence
History of Christian thought on persecution and tolerance
Persecution of Christians
Persecution of Eastern Orthodox Christians
Persecution of Jehovah's Witnesses
Sectarian violence among Christians
The Bible and violence

References

Christian ethics
Christianity and violence
Persecution of Christians
Persecution by Christians